MATRIX Architects Engineers Planners, Inc. is an architecture, interior design, engineering, and planning firm established in 1984.  Its offices are located in Williams Tower Two in downtown Tulsa, Oklahoma, U.S.

Notable projects include architects and engineers of record for the BOK Center historic preservation and renovation of Expo Square Pavilion
and Tulsa Expo Center.  MATRIX also provided design services for an addition and renovation to Edison Preparatory School. Tulsa Convention Center expansion and renovation (Currently known as the COX Business Center), and Tulsa Technology Center-Broken Arrow Campus expansion.

References

External links
MATRIX Architects Engineers Planners, Inc.

Architecture firms based in Oklahoma
Companies based in Tulsa, Oklahoma